Damaged was an Australian deathgrind band from Ballarat, Victoria, active from 1989 to 2004.

History
The band was formed by drummer Matt "Skitz" Sanders. Mat Silcock and Chris Hill were the two original guitarists, with bass player Jason Parker and singer James Ludbrook.

The band's first demo, The Art of Destroying Life, appeared in 1992; the next year they released their first album, Do Not Spit, on Black Hole Records. In 1994 Damaged toured with Cannibal Corpse. Silcock left Damaged in 1996, and around the same time, due to a dispute with label Black Hole Records, Damaged disbanded. Hill joined Melbourne band Discordia; Sanders toured Europe as drummer with Sadistik Exekution and played in Abramelin.

The split only lasted a short time, since the band was approached by US label Rotten Records and offered a five-album deal. Reforming without Silcock, Damaged released Token Remedies Research in 1997 and finished the year with a performance at the Metal for the Brain festival. Early the following year, the band toured Australia with Entombed but the reunion was almost cut short when Ludbrook was fired in the middle of a tour a few months later. Brendan Birge from the Melbourne death metal band Earth joined Damaged as Ludbrook's replacement after a brief stint by Chris Wallace, but found the constant tensions within the group difficult and resigned in mid-1999. Parker also left and Damaged continued only as a recording project, with Sanders and Hill providing a track for the all-Australian double heavy metal CD Under the Southern Cross.

Late in 1999, former Brutal Truth singer Kevin Sharp joined Damaged. In 2000 the album Purified in Pain was released, featuring bass contributions by Terry Vainoras of Melbourne death metal band Order of Chaos. With Eddy Lacey of Melbourne thrash band The Wolves filling in as the group's bass player, Damaged embarked on a national tour in December. Sharp's relationship with the band ended after this and Damaged went into hiatus for some time. Hill remained active as a member of a band called Running With Scissors and Sanders recorded an album entitled Lords of Eternity with his black metal band, now named Hellspawn.

With Parker returning to the line-up and ex-Uncle Chunk singer Dave Saddington on vocals, Damaged began playing live again in mid-2003. A short national tour was followed by supporting Sepultura's national tour; Damaged ended the year by headlining Metal for the Brain.

Damaged played its final performances in January 2004. Citing a serious health condition, Sanders was unable to continue. In March 2004 Hill confirmed that Damaged had ended playing live with Sanders, but may continue recording in the future.

Shortly after ending Damaged, Sanders joined a new hardcore band called Walk the Earth that featured Ludbrook and Superheist guitarist DW Norton. After an EP and a short spate of tours that included shows with Slipknot and Mudvayne, Ludbrook left and the band folded in mid-2005. The singer quickly announced plans to reform Damaged with Sanders; however, in early 2006 the pair announced their new band would instead be called Terrorust. Terrorust has since released a full-length album, Post Mortal Archives.

Members

Final Members
Matt "Skitz" Sanders - drums (1989-2004)
Jason "Mohawk" Parker - bass (1989–1999, 2003–2004)
Chris "Hilly" Hill - guitar (1991-2004)
Dave Saddington - vocals (2003–2004)

Past members
Brendan Burge	 - Vocals (1998-1999)
Kevin Sharp - vocals (1999–2001)
Terry Vainoras - bass (2000)
James Ludbrook - vocals (1989–1996, 1997)
Mat Silcock - guitar (1989–1996)
Chris Wallace - vocals (1998)
Jason Maggs - bass (1999)
Jaymi Ludbrooke - bass (1989), Vocals (1989-1995, 1997–1999)
Paul Medic - guitar (1989)
Jarrod Bongiorno - guitar (1989)
Ed Lacey - bass (2000)

Timeline

Discography

References

Musical groups established in 1989
Victoria (Australia) musical groups
Australian heavy metal musical groups
Musical groups disestablished in 2004